Critters: A New Binge is an American horror-comedy web television series that premiered on Shudder on March 21, 2019. A reboot of the original franchise, the series takes place in Livingston, Iowa and features all new characters.

Premise
The Krites arrive on Earth on a secret mission to rescue a missing comrade. Standing in the way of their plans are a group of high school students: Christopher (Joey Morgan), his crush Dana (Stephi Chin-Salvo), and his best friend, Charlie (Bzhaun Rhoden). The teens soon receive help in the form of three intergalactic bounty hunters.

Cast and characters
Joey Morgan as Christopher
Stephi Chin-Salvo as Dana
Bzhaun Rhoden as Charlie
Kirsten Robek as Veronica
Gilbert Gottfried as Uncle
Tom Pickett as Bounty Hunter #1
Toby Levins as Bounty Hunter #2

Episodes

Production

Development
In 2014, Warner Bros. announced plans to produce a web series based on the Critters films. Producer Peter Girardi at Warner Bros. Digital reached out to writer-director Jordan Rubin to see if he was interested in the project. Rubin put together a pitch for the series with his writing partners, Jon and Al Kaplan, and the project was greenlit.

Filming
Principal photography for the series reportedly began during the last week of May 2018 in Vancouver, British Columbia, Canada. Filming wrapped in July.

Release
Shudder acquired the series from Warner Bros. Television in February 2019. All eight ten-minute episodes premiered on Shudder on March 21.

Reception
The series received mixed reviews. Bloody Disgusting gave the series one-and-a-half skulls, declaring the "CG effects are so Syfy-level bad that they wouldn’t have even passed muster back in the ’90s" and the episodes "absolutely loaded with that bargain basement effects work" and "lowbrow humor". JoBlo gave the series a 6 out of 10, saying that "there's going to be a split reaction to A New Binge. I don't think the story crafted by Rubin and his co-writers Al Kaplan and Jon Kaplan is one that anybody was expecting to see told in this franchise". Ultimately, the review felt it was "a very innocuous piece of entertainment".

References

External links

2010s American horror television series
2010s American science fiction television series
English-language television shows
Horror drama television series
Television shows set in Iowa
Films set in Iowa
Critters (franchise)
Alien invasions in television
Television series by Blue Ribbon Content
Science fiction horror web series
Comedy horror web series
Web series featuring puppetry
Films shot in Vancouver